Roman's carpet viper (Echis romani) is a species of viper native mainly to Nigeria and southwestern Chad. Like all other vipers, it is venomous.

References 

Reptiles described in 2018
Taxa named by Jean-François Trape
Viperinae